The vz. 27 is a Czechoslovak semi-automatic pistol, based on the pistole vz. 24, and chambered for 7.65 mm Browning/.32 ACP. It is often designated the CZ 27 after the naming scheme used by the Česká zbrojovka factory for post-World War II commercial products. However, it is correctly known as vz. 27, an abbreviation of the Czech "vzor 27", or "Model 27".

After the German occupation of Czechoslovakia in mid-March 1939 the pistol was folded into the German armed and police forces as the P27. 
One notable example was confiscated from a German guard in Colditz by the 'Medium Sized Man' (Flt. Lt. Dominic Bruce OBE MC AFM KSG) the day it was liberated.
Construction of the pistol continued in Czechoslovakia until the 1950s. Allegedly, the Czechoslovak military authorities sold five and a half thousand surplus vz. 27s to the Swiss in 1973 for half a million marks. Between 620,000 and 650,000 were manufactured in total, 452,500 of those under German occupation. In December 1948, a gift of five "ČZ 247" automatic variants of the pistol (based on both the vz. 24 and vz. 27) was sent to Ethiopian emperor Haile Selassie. In 1949, the pistol was exported to 28 countries, including Turkey (3,286 pistols), Great Britain, South Africa, Egypt, Kenya, and Pakistan.

Users

See also 

 Weapons of Czechoslovakia interwar period

References

 CZ 27 Serial Numbers & Year of Manufacture. Details of Markings
 Historic Firearms Images
 CZ 27 / P.27(t) pistol (Czhechoslovakia) at Modern Firearms & Ammunition
 
 CZ-27 pistol explained (Ebook)

.32 ACP semi-automatic pistols
Semi-automatic pistols of Czechoslovakia
World War II infantry weapons of Germany
Weapons and ammunition introduced in 1927